In probability theory and statistics, the moment-generating function of a real-valued random variable is an alternative specification of its probability distribution. Thus, it provides the basis of an alternative route to analytical results compared with working directly with probability density functions or cumulative distribution functions. There are particularly simple results for the moment-generating functions of distributions defined by the weighted sums of random variables. However, not all random variables have moment-generating functions.

As its name implies, the moment-generating function can be used to compute a distribution’s moments: the nth moment about 0 is the nth derivative of the moment-generating function, evaluated at 0.

In addition to real-valued distributions (univariate distributions), moment-generating functions can be defined for vector- or matrix-valued random variables, and can even be extended to more general cases.

The moment-generating function of a real-valued distribution does not always exist, unlike the characteristic function. There are relations between the behavior of the moment-generating function of a distribution and properties of the distribution, such as the existence of moments.

Definition
Let  be a random variable with CDF .

If the expectation does not exist in a neighborhood of 0, we say that the moment generating function does not exist.

In other words, the moment-generating function of X is the expectation of the random variable .

 always exists and is equal to 1. However, a key problem with moment-generating functions is that moments and the moment-generating function may not exist, as the integrals need not converge absolutely. By contrast, the characteristic function or Fourier transform always exists (because it is the integral of a bounded function on a space of finite measure), and for some purposes may be used instead.

The moment-generating function is so named because it can be used to find the moments of the distribution.

 

Hence

 

where  is the th moment.
see Calculations of moments below.

If  is a continuous random variable, the following relation between its moment-generating function  and the two-sided Laplace transform of its probability density function  holds:

since the PDF's two-sided Laplace transform is given as

and the moment-generating function's definition expands (by the law of the unconscious statistician) to
 

See the relation of the Fourier and Laplace transforms for further information.

Examples
Here are some examples of the moment-generating function and the characteristic function for comparison. It can be seen that the characteristic function is a Wick rotation of the moment-generating function  when the latter exists.
{|class="wikitable"
|-
! Distribution
! Moment-generating function 
! Characteristic function 
|-
|Degenerate 
|
|
|-
| Bernoulli  
| 
| 
|-
| Geometric  
|   
| 
|-
| Binomial 
| 
| 
|-
|Negative binomial 
|
|
|-
| Poisson 
|  
|  
|- 
| Uniform (continuous) 
| 
| 
|- 
| Uniform (discrete) 
| 
| 
|-
|Laplace 
|
|
|-
| Normal 
| 
| 
|-
| Chi-squared 
| 
| 
|-
|Noncentral chi-squared 
| 
| 
|-
| Gamma 
|
| 
|-
| Exponential 
| 
| 
|-
|Beta
|
| (see Confluent hypergeometric function)
|-
| Multivariate normal 
|
|
|-
| Cauchy 
|Does not exist
| 
|-
|Multivariate Cauchy 

|Does not exist
|
|-
|}

Calculation
The moment-generating function is the expectation of a function of the random variable, it can be written as:

 For a discrete probability mass function, 
 For a continuous probability density function, 
 In the general case: , using the Riemann–Stieltjes integral, and  where  is the cumulative distribution function.

 

where  is the th moment.

Linear transformations of random variables 
If random variable  has moment generating function , then  has moment generating function

Linear combination of independent random variables
If , where the Xi are independent random variables and the ai are constants, then the probability density function for Sn is the convolution of the probability density functions of each of the Xi, and the moment-generating function for Sn is given by

Vector-valued random variables
For vector-valued random variables  with real components, the moment-generating function is given by

Important properties

Moment generating functions are positive and log-convex, with M(0) = 1.

An important property of the moment-generating function is that it uniquely determines the distribution.

then

for all values of x (or equivalently X and Y have the same distribution). This statement is not equivalent to the statement "if two distributions have the same moments, then they are identical at all points." This is because in some cases, the moments exist and yet the moment-generating function does not, because the limit

may not exist. The log-normal distribution is an example of when this occurs.

Calculations of moments
The moment-generating function is so called because if it exists on an open interval around t = 0, then it is the exponential generating function of the moments of the probability distribution:

That is, with n being a nonnegative integer, the nth moment about 0 is the nth derivative of the moment generating function, evaluated at t = 0.

Other properties
Jensen's inequality provides a simple lower bound on the moment-generating function:

where  is the mean of X.

The moment-generating function can be used in conjunction with Markov's inequality to bound the upper tail of a real random variable X. This statement is also called the Chernoff bound.
 
for any  and any a, provided  exists. This gives , which is within a factor of 1+a of the exact value.

Various lemmas, such as Hoeffding's lemma or Bennett's inequality provide bounds on the moment-generating function in the case of a zero-mean, bounded random variable.

When  is non-negative, the moment generating function gives a simple, useful bound on the moments:

This follows from the inequality  into which we can substitute  implies  for any .

As an example, consider  with  degrees of freedom. Then from the examples .
Picking  and substituting into the bound:

To compare the bounds, we can consider the asymptotics for large .
The moment-generating function bound is thus very strong in this case.

Relation to other functions
Related to the moment-generating function are a number of other transforms that are common in probability theory:

Characteristic function The characteristic function  is related to the moment-generating function via  the characteristic function is the moment-generating function of iX or the moment generating function of X evaluated on the imaginary axis.  This function can also be viewed as the Fourier transform of the probability density function, which can therefore be deduced from it by inverse Fourier transform.
Cumulant-generating function The cumulant-generating function is defined as the logarithm of the moment-generating function; some instead define the cumulant-generating function as the logarithm of the characteristic function, while others call this latter the second cumulant-generating function.
Probability-generating function The probability-generating function is defined as  This immediately implies that

See also
 Characteristic function (probability theory)
 Entropic value at risk
 Factorial moment generating function
 Rate function
 Hamburger moment problem

References

Citations

Sources

 

Moment (mathematics)
Generating functions